Buckleys Corner is a crossroads in the Canadian province of Nova Scotia, located in Kings County. Located just north of Waterville, Nova Scotia, it is part of the rural community of Grafton, Nova Scotia.

References
  Buckleys Corner on Destination Nova Scotia

Communities in Kings County, Nova Scotia
General Service Areas in Nova Scotia